Tessitore is an Italian surname. Notable people with the surname include:

 Andrea Tessitore (born 1973), Italian lawyer and entrepreneur
 Giuseppe Raffaele Tessitore (1861–1916), Italian painter
 Joe Tessitore (born 1971), American sportscaster

Italian-language surnames